Bathford (pronounced with the emphasis on the second syllable) is a village and civil parish  east of Bath, England.

History

The ancient charter Codex Diplomaticus Aevi Saxonici describes a manor parish consisting of three tithings or quasi manors: Bathford in the centre, Shockerwick to the north, and Warley [Warleigh] to the south. This corresponds closely to the current boundaries. This manor was known as Forde up until the seventeenth century; the name was derived from the ford that crosses the By Brook, connecting Bathford to neighbouring Batheaston.

Near the river crossing is the site of a Roman villa, the hypocaust of which was found about the middle of the seventeenth century. This villa is described in John Aubrey's Monumenta Britannica:

The ford from which the village derived its name was connected with the Fosse Way. This is mentioned in a Saxon charter of the tenth century relating to the manor. The Fosse Way stills forms the boundary of the parish.

Bathford was part of the hundred of Bath Forum.

The old Bathford railway bridge was built by Isambard Kingdom Brunel as part of the Great Western Railway. A station called Bathford Halt closed in 1965.

Near Bathford, on the opposite side of the river, is a large meadow known as Horselands where, according to tradition, the Roman cavalry were exercised. More recently, the area bounded by Ostlings Lane and the Bradford Road (A363) was used to keep the spare horses used to haul the mail coaches up Bathford Hill. They then returned to the field to await the next coach. Some older long-standing residents of Bathford still refer to Ostlings Lane as Horses Lane. Whether the two areas are related is somewhat uncertain.

Bathford has been formally twinned with Artannes-sur-Indre in France since 2005.

Governance

The parish council has responsibility for local issues, including setting an annual precept (local rate) to cover the council's operating costs and producing annual accounts for public scrutiny. The parish council evaluates local planning applications and works with the local police, district council officers, and neighbourhood watch groups on matters of crime, security, and traffic. The parish council's role also includes initiating projects for the maintenance and repair of parish facilities, such as the village hall or community centre, playing fields and playgrounds, as well as consulting with the district council on the maintenance, repair, and improvement of highways, drainage, footpaths, public transport, and street cleaning. Conservation matters (including trees and listed buildings) and environmental issues are also of interest to the council.

The parish falls within the unitary authority of Bath and North East Somerset which was created in 1996, as established by the Local Government Act 1992. It provides a single tier of local government with responsibility for almost all local government functions within its area including local planning and building control, local roads, council housing, environmental health, markets and fairs, refuse collection, recycling, cemeteries, crematoria, leisure services, parks, and tourism. It is also responsible for education, social services, libraries, main roads, public transport, trading standards, waste disposal and strategic planning, although fire, police and ambulance services are provided jointly with other authorities through the Avon Fire and Rescue Service, Avon and Somerset Constabulary and the Great Western Ambulance Service.

Bath and North East Somerset's area covers part of the ceremonial county of Somerset but it is administered independently of the non-metropolitan county. Its administrative headquarters is in Bath. Between 1 April 1974 and 1 April 1996, it was the Wansdyke district and the City of Bath of the county of Avon. Before 1974 that the parish was part of the Bathavon Rural District.

The parish is represented in the House of Commons of the Parliament of the United Kingdom as part of North East Somerset. It elects one Member of Parliament (MP) by the first past the post system of election. It was also part of the South West England constituency of the European Parliament prior to Britain leaving the European Union in January 2020, which elected seven MEPs using the d'Hondt method of party-list proportional representation.

Geography

The old walled village of Bathford is on the A363, approximately one kilometre south of the A4. Bathford Bridge is where the A363 crosses the By Brook (also known as Box Brook, The Weaver and Withy Brook). The original bridge was built in the thirteenth or fourteenth century to replace the ford which gave the village its name.

Bathford extends up one side of the Avonvale Valley. There are several routes up to the valley ridge, which was once the site of active stone quarrying. This ridge offers commanding views of the valley below and also of nearby Solsbury Hill.

Landmarks

Shockerwick House was built as a country house around 1750 by John Wood the Elder and is now offices and a nursing home. It has been designated as a Grade I listed building.

Religious sites

St Swithun's Church, parts of which may date from the twelfth century, is the resting place of Admiral Lord Nelson's sister, Ann. The church has Romanesque origins and the dedication to St. Swithun is thought to have been in 1323 AD.

The north aisle and porch were added in 1856, the south aisle and nave in 1870–72 and the west tower between 1879 and 1880.

Events

There is a flower show every September which is usually hosted in the village hall but, in 2022, was hosted in the school hall.
Due to Covid-19 the flower show was unable to be hosted as usual. In 2020, nothing happened. 
In 2021, people put up tables with fruits, vegetables, flowers, etc... in their gardens for people to see.

Education

There is a school in Bathford called Bathford Primary School (formerly known as Bathford CofE VC School).

Notable residents
 Danny Kustow (1955–2019), pop musician, guitarist with the Tom Robinson Band.
 Manny Elias (born 1953), rock musician, drummer for Tears for Fears from 1981 to 1986.

References

External links

Bathford Parish Council
Bathford Scout Group – 23rd Bath Scouts

Villages in Bath and North East Somerset
Civil parishes in Somerset